Aleksandrs Fedotovs (born 29 March 1971) is a retired Latvian football midfielder.

References

External links

1971 births
Living people
Soviet footballers
Latvian footballers
FC FShM Torpedo Moscow players
Dinaburg FC players
FK Liepājas Metalurgs players
FK Venta players
Association football midfielders
Latvia international footballers